Amulets & Armor is a first-person role-playing video game for IBM PC compatibles created by David Webster and Eric Webster and United Software Artists and published as shareware in 1997. In 2013 the game was re-released as Freeware and open-source software.

Gameplay 
The game is divided up into quests made up of multiple separate levels which are each against different foes in different areas with different end goals. The player chooses a character between eleven default characters: Knight, Paladin, Rogue, Mercenary, Sailor, Magician, Priest, Citizen, Mage, Warlock, and Archer.  According to the promotion, the game is overall set, "In the underground catacombs of the castle Arius," but only a few levels actually are.

History

Development and release 
United Software Artists developed for Amulets & Armor an own Doom-like 2.5D game engine. As map format was the Doom one  used so that there available tools for creation could be used. The targeted platform was the PC with MS-DOS, utilizing a 256 color VGA graphics mode with 320x200 resolution.

Beyond the Doom-like capabilities had the game's engine RPG features like various character classes, a magic system, character advancement and inventory system, a hunger and thirst mechanic, and a detailed level construction system. The game was somewhat noteworthy for its implementation of features commonly associated with fantasy role-playing games in a first-person shooter engine before this was common (while it did not innovate these features). The much more famous Ultima Underworld games implemented similar features a half-decade earlier with comparable VGA/MIDI production values. Although a more apt comparison is perhaps The Elder Scrolls II: Daggerfall released by Bethesda Softworks the previous year with similar features, which became much more famous. To set the game's graphic capabilities in perspective, Quake, one of the first fully 3D and textured games, came out the previous year and Quake II came out the same year as Amulets & Armor.

The game was released in 1997 after two years of development as shareware on disc, including a musical score (both CD quality and MIDI versions of the music were available on the disc). A game demo version was offered too.

Freeware re-release and open sourcing 
After being unavailable and unsupported Abandonware for many years the original developers reacquired the rights to Amulets & Armor around February 2013. Later in 2013 the game was re-released as freeware on the game's official site and the source code under GPLv3 on GitHub. Work continues for ports to newer systems (Windows, MacOS), including general bug fixes, and changing the graphic back-end to OpenGL.

Reception 
Amulets & Armor was a commercial flop with fewer than 100 units sold, due to the outdated production values, confusing user interface, and inadequate shareware marketing. It remained generally unknown until it was released by abandonware webpages.

On the freeware re-release in 2013, Rock, Paper, Shotgun reviewed Amulets & Armor and called it "absurd, ambitious, more than a little clunky" and "get past the initial learning curve and you might find something with legs.".

References

External links 

  (archived old website)
 
Article at thecan.org 

Role-playing video games
Action role-playing video games
DOS games
Freeware games
Multiplayer and single-player video games
1997 video games
Windows games
Open-source video games
Commercial video games with freely available source code
Video games developed in the United States